Maialen Chourraut Yurramendi (born 8 March 1983 in Lasarte-Oria) is a Spanish slalom canoeist who has competed at the international level since 2000.

Chourraut has a full set of Olympic medals. She won the gold medal in the K1 event at the 2016 Summer Olympics in Rio de Janeiro. She went on to win a silver medal in the K1 event at the 2020 Summer Olympics in Tokyo. Previously she won a bronze medal in the K1 event at the 2012 Summer Olympics in London. She also competed in the K1 event at the 2008 Summer Olympics in Beijing, but was eliminated in the heats and finished in 16th place.

Chourraut won a silver medal in the K1 event at the 2009 ICF Canoe Slalom World Championships in La Seu d'Urgell. Two years later, she won a bronze medal in the K1 event at the 2011 ICF Canoe Slalom World Championships in Bratislava. She also won three medals at the European Championships (1 gold and 2 silvers).

World Cup individual podiums

References

 13 September 2009 final results of the women's K1 event at the 2009 ICF Canoe Slalom World Championships. – accessed 13 September 2009.

External links

 
 

1983 births
Living people
Sportspeople from Gipuzkoa
Spanish female canoeists
Olympic canoeists of Spain
Canoeists at the 2008 Summer Olympics
Canoeists at the 2012 Summer Olympics
Canoeists at the 2016 Summer Olympics
Canoeists at the 2020 Summer Olympics
Olympic gold medalists for Spain
Olympic silver medalists for Spain
Olympic bronze medalists for Spain
Olympic medalists in canoeing
Medalists at the 2012 Summer Olympics
Medalists at the 2016 Summer Olympics
Medalists at the 2020 Summer Olympics
People from Lasarte-Oria
Canoeists from the Basque Country (autonomous community)
21st-century Spanish women